The 1938 Invercargill mayoral by-election was held on 19 October 1938 to elect the Mayor of Invercargill after the death of John Miller on 20 September. Miller had been elected to a fourth consecutive term in May.

Background
Ralph Hanan was elected to council in 1935 and became deputy mayor in May 1938.

Results
The following table gives the election results:

References

1938 elections in New Zealand
Mayoral elections in Invercargill